Frin is an Argentine novel written by Luis Pescetti. It was first published in 1998.

Books by Luis Pescetti
1998 novels